Radu Albot was the defending champion but lost in the first round to Zhang Ze.

Miomir Kecmanović won the title after defeating Blaž Kavčič 6–2, 2–6, 6–3 in the final.

Seeds

Draw

Finals

Top half

Bottom half

References
Main Draw
Qualifying Draw

Shenzhen Longhua Open - Men's Singles